Denílson is a Portuguese given name. Among people with this name are:

Football
Denílson (footballer, born 1943), Denílson Custódio Machado, attacking midfielder
Denilson (footballer, born 1972), Denilson Antonio Paludo, midfielder
Denílson (footballer, born 1976), Denílson Martins Nascimento, striker
Denílson (footballer, born 1977), Denílson de Oliveira Araújo, forward, former Real Betis player and Brazil international
Denílson (footballer, born 1988), Denílson Pereira Neves, midfielder, former São Paulo and Arsenal player
Denílson (footballer, born 1995), Denílson Pereira Júnior, striker
Denilson (footballer, born 2001), Denilson Alves Borges, Brazilian footballer
Denilson Costa (born 1968), Brazilian-born Honduras international and forward
Denílson Gabionetta (born 1985), winger

Other
Denílson Lourenço (born 1977), Brazilian judoka

See also
Danielson (disambiguation)
Danielsson (disambiguation)
Danielsen (disambiguation)
Danielsan (disambiguation)
Donelson (disambiguation)

Portuguese masculine given names